Park Jong-won  (born on April 12, 1955) is a South Korean footballer who played for 1. FC Kaiserslautern, K. Sint-Truidense V.V., Daewoo Royals as a forward.

Career

Early career
He joined Bundesliga side 1. FC Kaiserslautern in 1981

In May 1983, he returned to Korea and joined Daewoo Royals with Kim Min-hai.

Honours 
Daewoo Royals
 K League 1: 1984
Individual
 1980 King's Cup: Top goalscorer

References

External links
 
 
 International Records
 Park Jong-won Official Blog

1955 births
Living people
Association football forwards
South Korean footballers
South Korean expatriate footballers
South Korea international footballers
South Korean football managers
1. FC Kaiserslautern players
Sint-Truidense V.V. players
Busan IPark players
Bundesliga players
K League 1 players
Expatriate footballers in Germany
South Korean expatriate sportspeople in Germany
Yonsei University alumni